Khosrov Mkhargrdzeli was Georgian-Armenian landholder during the 11th century in Armenian Kingdom of Tashir-Dzoraget and Kingdom of Georgia. Khosrov is first historically traceable member of Zakarids–Mkhargrdzeli.

Biography 
Khosrov was member of Zakarids–Mkhargrdzeli dynasty. Believed that Khosrov's ancestors belonged to Mesopotamian Kurdish tribe of Babir, or ancestry from Armenian Kamsarakan dynasty.

References

Source 
Shoshiashvili, N., Georgian Soviet Encyclopedia, vol. 7, p. 272. Tbilisi, 1984

House of Mkhargrdzeli
Nobility of Georgia (country)
Military personnel from Georgia (country)
11th-century people from Georgia (country)
Year of birth unknown
Politicians from Georgia (country)
Georgian people of Armenian descent